Robert Clifford (21 November 1883–unknown) was a Scottish footballer who played in the Football League for Bolton Wanderers, Everton and Fulham. He played in the 1904 FA Cup Final for Bolton, losing 1–0 to Manchester City.

References

1883 births
Scottish footballers
Association football defenders
English Football League players
Bolton Wanderers F.C. players
Everton F.C. players
South Liverpool F.C. (1890s) players
Fulham F.C. players
Year of death missing
FA Cup Final players